Dendrobium epiphyticum, commonly known as the Illawarra rock orchid, is a species of epiphytic or lithophytic orchid that is endemic to New South Wales. It has tapered or cylindrical pseudobulbs, up to five thick, leathery leaves and up to fifty cream-coloured or pale yellow flowers with reddish purple markings on the labellum.

Description 
The sides lobes are erect and blunt and the middle lobe has a rounded tip. Flowering occurs between September and November.

Taxonomy and naming
The Illawarra rock orchid was first formally described in 2006 by David Jones and Mark Clements from a plant grown in the Australian National Botanic Gardens from a specimen collected on the Cambewarra Mountain. It was given the name Thelychiton epiphyticus and the description was published in Australian Orchid Research. In 2014, Julian Shaw changed the name to Dendrobium epiphyticum. The specific epithet (epiphyticum) is derived from the Ancient Greek words epi meaning "beside', "upon", "over" or "after", and phyton meaning "plant" referring to the epiphytic habit of this orchid.

Distribution and habitat
Dendrobium epiphyticum grows on trees in moist forest and rainforest, sometimes on cliffs near waterfalls. It occurs in New South Wales between Robertson and Cambewarra.

References

epiphyticum
Endemic orchids of Australia
Orchids of New South Wales
Plants described in 2006